Paraspathulina is a genus of tephritid  or fruit flies in the family Tephritidae.

Species
Paraspathulina apicomacula Hardy & Drew, 1996
Paraspathulina eremostigma Hardy & Drew, 1996
Paraspathulina trimacula Hancock & Drew, 2003

References

Tephritinae
Tephritidae genera
Diptera of Australasia